Franklin Backus may refer to:

 Franklin P. Backus (1913–2007), judge and mayor of Alexandria, Virginia
 Franklin Thomas Backus (1813–1870), American lawyer and politician